Dipsizgöl can refer to:

 Dipsizgöl, İnegöl
 Dipsizgöl, Kaynaşlı